Società Sportiva Calcio Bari, commonly referred to as Bari, is an Italian football club based in Bari, Apulia. The team finished the 2021–22 season in first place in Serie C and earned promotion to Serie B for the 2022–23 season. 

Bari was originally founded in 1908 and refounded several times, most recently in 2018. The club spent many seasons bouncing between the top two divisions in Italian football, Serie A and Serie B. The club was formerly known as A.S. Bari or F.C. Bari 1908 as well as other names, due to re-foundations. Bari usually plays in all-white with red detailing.

Statistically, Bari is the most successful club from the Apulia region, in terms of the all-time Serie A records. The club is among the elite in Southern Italian football and is ranked 17th in the all-time Serie A records. The club won the Mitropa Cup in 1990.

One of the most notable achievements in the club's history was in the 1996 season, when forward Igor Protti became the top scorer in Serie A with 24 goals. The club is known in the wider footballing world for producing Antonio Cassano who was born in Bari, he shone at the club as a youngster.

History

The foundation

Bari Foot-Ball Club was founded in the city on 15 January 1908. Like the majority of early Italian football clubs, foreign people were involved in the foundation of the club. Amongst the main founders were German Floriano Ludwig, Swiss Gustavo Kuhn and a native trader of Bari called Giovanni Tiberini.

The first players included many non-Italians, the FBC Bari originals included; founder Ludwig, along with Barther (English), Bach (Swiss), Attoma, Roth (Swiss), Labourdette (Spanish), Jovinet (French), Giordano, Gazagne (French), Randi and Ziegler. Originally the club wore red shirts with white shorts, early on they would play against English sailors at the San Lorenzo field in the San Pasquale area of Bari.

Although the club was founded early on, clubs from the Mezzogiorno were not very well represented in the early Italian football championships and thus Bari did not take part in the early seasons. In fact only Campania had a regional section in the league from that area prior to the First World War. The war would see the original club becoming defunct, before being reorganised in 1924 under the same name.

By this time other clubs from the city had begun playing too, including Foot-Ball Club Liberty who originally wore blue and white stripes, they were founded as a dissident club from the original Bari in 1909 and their rivals Unione Sportiva Ideale who wore green and black stripes and was founded in 1908. It was FBC Liberty who became the first ever side from the Province of Bari to take part in the Italian Football Championship, this was during the 1921–22 CCI season, when the main clubs in the country had a falling out with FIGC.

The following season Ideale became the first side from Bari to progress to the Southern Italian semi-finals round, but lost out to Lazio. All three clubs featured in the championship for the first time in 1924–25 however FBC Bari were relegated and ceased to exist again in 1927, Liberty on the other hand reached the Southern semi-finals before losing out heavily to Alba Roma.

Unione Sportiva Bari
During the 1926-1928 period the whole of Italian football was changing and beginning to become more organised, and several mergers were taking place in Naples, Florence and Rome around the same time. FBC Liberty opted to change their name into Bari FC and first used it on 6 February 1927 in a match against Audace Taranto, then on 27 February 1928 Bari FC merged with US Ideale to create Unione Sportiva Bari. The US Bari retaken the red and white colours of FBC Bari.

After the Italian Championship of 1928–29, the league system was reorganised and Bari was placed in Serie B. One of their players was called up in the Italy national football team that season for the first time, in the form of Raffaele Costantino, this made Bari the first Serie B club to contribute a player and a scorer to the national side.

Between Serie A and Serie B
The 1930s and 1940s were Bari's golden age, spending much of that time in Serie A with a finish of seventh in 1947 being the best they achieved.

In the 1950s Bari went into a sharp decline and an equally rapid revival towards the end of the decade to spend three more years in Serie A (1958–61). Stars of the team in this period included Biagio Catalano and Raúl Conti. The club returned to Serie A twice more in this period (1963–64 and 1969–70) with the latter proving especially harrowing with only 11 goals scored, the lowest of any top-flight club. In 1974 Bari descended to Serie C, finishing that season with only 12 goals scored and 26 conceded in 38 games.

By the late 1970s Bari were back in Serie B and on something of an upward swing, narrowly missing promotion in 1982. They managed promotion to Serie A in 1985 and acquired English players Gordon Cowans and Paul Rideout, but they were unable to prevent an instant return to Serie B.

A return to Serie A in 1989 with stars including stalwart defender Giovanni Loseto, midfielder Pietro Maiellaro and Brazilian striker João Paulo saw a respectable 10th-place finish in 1990, their last season at the Della Vittoria. The following season saw Bari move to the San Nicola stadium, built for the 1990 World Cup, but by 1992, despite the signing of David Platt, and they would be relegated once more.

Promotion in 1994 saw another two-year stay in Serie A with Igor Protti clinching league topscorer in 1995-96 season, and another promotion in 1997 saw the emergence of promising youngsters like Nicola Ventola, Gianluca Zambrotta, Antonio Cassano and Diego De Ascentis. This time they managed a four-year stay in Serie A under the guidance of Eugenio Fascetti, despite his uneasy relationship with many sections of the club's support. The club has since had a generally indifferent spell in Serie B. However, having been near the top of the Serie B table for much of the 2008–09 season they gained promotion to Serie A on 8 May 2009, under the guidance of Antonio Conte.

In November 2009, a take-over bid was rejected. A Texas-based company JMJ Holdings also gave an intent to take over in August 2009.

With Leonardo Bonucci and Andrea Ranocchia as centre-back and Barreto as striker, Bari performed well in the first half of the season. Eventually Bari finished 10th. However, Bari lost €19 million in 2009 financial year, which meant Bari was quiet in the 2010 summer window (only Almirón and Ghezzal were the new significant signings plus the purchase of Barreto after the expiration of his loan, who broke his leg in mid-season) and in the January 2011 transfer window, they failed to find a replacement of Bonucci and Ranocchia. The company recovered from negative equity due to TV income increasing as well as the sale of Bonucci (a profit of €6.45 million). Bari had a positive equity of €870,653 on 31 December 2010 and a net income of 14 million in the 2010 calendar year, due to extraordinary income from selling the brand.

Bari were relegated to Serie B after the 2010–11 season finishing 17 points short of 17th placed Lecce. During the season, manager Giampiero Ventura was replaced by Bortolo Mutti in a failed attempt to save the club from relegation. On 4 March 2011, Bari played its 1,000th game in Serie A.

The End of the Matarrese reign
On 13 June 2011, President Vincenzo Matarrese and the rest of the board of directors resigned after 28 years of controlling the club. Vincenzo Torrente was brought in to manage the side in the summer of 2011 and much of the playing roster was let go due to financial difficulties at the club and replaced by young players. Despite six and seven point penalties in the following two seasons, Bari under Torrente were able to achieve to mid-table Serie B finishes however, disconcertingly, attendances continued to dwindle. In the summer of 2013, Torrente resigned and was replaced by Carmine Gautieri, who also resigned after two weeks. The top job was then assigned to Roberto Alberti Mazzaferro.

The financial position of the club continued to decline and the Mattarese family reduced the amount of money they put into the club. The club's debt reached €30m in February 2014. The club was declared bankrupt on 10 March 2014. The first bankruptcy auction, on 18 April 2014, was declared deserted due to the lack of a bid that met all of the criterion. The second auction, on 12 May 2014, also failed to find a successful bidder. The club was in real danger of disappearing.

F.C. Bari 1908

The third bankruptcy auction was held on 20 May 2014 with an asking price for the club of just €2m. A consortium F.C. Bari 1908 S.p.A. led by former Serie A referee Gianluca Paparesta successfully acquired the club assets and sports title. A strong spell of form towards the end of the season, where the club lost just two of its last 15 Serie B matches, meant that Bari qualified for the 2013–14 Serie B play-offs. Bari met Crotone in the quarter finals and won 3–0, setting up a clash against Latina, the side that finished 3rd in the regular season. The first leg of the play-off semifinal was a sell out with over 50,000 people attending the match, an incredible achievement considering the club recorded an attendance of less than 1,000 just a few months earlier. Bari were knocked out due to two draws (2–2 and 2–2).

In 2014–15 the team ended the season in 10th place. In 2015–16 Bari gained 5th place in the league and subsequent access to the play-off preliminary match against Novara but lost 3–4 after extra time at Stadio San Nicola.

In December 2015, Cosmo Giancaspro acquired 5% shares of Bari. In April 2016 Noordin Ahmad signed a preliminary agreement to acquire 50% shares of the club but the deal collapsed; In June 2016 Cosmo Giancaspro became the sole director of the club, after the entire share capital were acquired by an Italian company Kreare Impresa S.r.l. According to La Repubblica, Kreare Impresa was owned by Giancaspro, but both Giancaspro and his company was involved in a money laundering investigation.

A new beginning: SSC Bari
On 16 July 2018, Bari were excluded by Co.Vi.Soc. from participating in 2018–19 Serie B due to financial reasons. The shareholders also tried to recapitalize the club and appeal the exclusion to Collegio di Garanzia of Italian National Olympic Committee (CONI), however, it was rejected.

Thanks to the Article 52 of N.O.I.F., it was reported that Aurelio De Laurentiis, the owner of football club Napoli and film company Filmauro, had won the rights to establish a phoenix club of Bari and restart in 2018–19 Serie D. He also re-established the current Napoli in 2004. The new club will be named S.S.C. Bari, with De Laurentiis stating his intention to bring it back to Serie A as fast as possible. The club was subsequently assigned to Group I of 2018–19 Serie D, traditionally destined to teams from Sicily and Calabria.

On 23 August 2018, as part of a press conference, Aurelio De Laurentiis announced his eldest son, film producer Luigi De Laurentiis Jr., as the new Bari chairman.

Bari was promoted to Serie C at the end of the 2018–19 season. In the following seasons, the club was always 
touted as a major contender for promotion to Serie B.

In the 2019–20 campaign, Bari ended the season in second place behind Reggina, and then making all the way to the playoff final where they were defeated by Reggiana after extra time, thus missing on immediate promotion to the Italian second division. Following a fourth place finish in the next season, the club hired Michele Mignani as head coach and strengthened the squad even further: this proved to be successful, as Bari won the Group C and gained promotion to Serie B on 3 April 2022, with four games yet to go.

Sponsors

Players

Out on loan

Presidential history

The official presidential history of Bari, since 1929 until the present day.

Alfredo Atti (1929–31)
Liborio Mincuzzi (1931–32)
Sebastiano Roca (1932–33)
Raffaele Tramonte (1933–34)
Giovanni Tomasicchio (1934–35)
Giovanni Di Cagno Abbrescia (1935–36)
Vincenzo Signorile (1936–37)
Giuseppe Abbruzzese (1937–38)
Giambattista Patarino (1938–39)
Angelo Albanese (1939–40)
Pasquale Ranieri (1940–41)
Giuseppe Santoro (1941–42)
Antonio De Palma (1941–44)
Andrea Somma (1942–43)
Tommaso Annoscia (1944–50)
Rocco Scafi (1950–51)
Florenzo Brattelli (1951–52)
Francesco Saverio Lonero (1952–53)
Achille Tarsia Incuria (1953–56)
Gianfranco Brunetti (1956–59)
Vincenzo La Gioia (1959–61)
Angelo Marino (1961–63)
Angelo De Palo (1961–77)
Antonio Matarrese (1977–83)
Vincenzo Matarrese (1983–2011)
Claudio Garzelli (2011–12) (as chief executive)
Francesco Vinella (2012–14) (as chief executive)
Gianluca Paparesta (2014–16)
Cosmo Giancaspro (2016–18)
Luigi De Laurentiis (2018–)

Coaching staff

Managerial history

Bari have had many managers and trainers, some seasons they have had co-managers running the team, here is a chronological list of them from 1928 onwards:

Honours
Serie B:
Champions: 1941–42, 2008–09
Serie C
Champions: 1954–55, 1966–67,  1976–77, 1983–84, 2021–22
Serie D
Champions: 1953–54, 2018–19

Mitropa Cup: 1
Winners: 1990

Divisional movements

See also
 2003–04 A.S. Bari season
 2012–13 A.S. Bari season

References

Site of football fans of Bari, video, photo, articles

External links

 

 
Football clubs in Apulia
Association football clubs established in 1908
Serie B clubs
1908 establishments in Italy